Franklin Township is one of the fourteen townships of Clermont County, Ohio, United States. The 2010 census reported 4,188 people living in the township, 3,307 of whom lived in the unincorporated portions of the township.

Geography
Located in the southeastern corner of the county along the Ohio River, it borders the following townships:
Tate Township - north
Lewis Township, Brown County - east
Washington Township - west
Bracken County, Kentucky lies across the Ohio River to the south.

Two incorporated villages are located in Franklin Township: Chilo in the southwest along the Ohio River, and Felicity in the center.  As well, the unincorporated community of Utopia lies in the township's south.

Name and history
It is one of 21 Franklin Townships statewide.

Government
The township is governed by a three-member board of trustees, who are elected in November of odd-numbered years to a four-year term beginning on the following January 1. Two are elected in the year after the presidential election and one is elected in the year before it. There is also an elected township fiscal officer, who serves a four-year term beginning on April 1 of the year after the election, which is held in November of the year before the presidential election. Vacancies in the fiscal officership or on the board of trustees are filled by the remaining trustees.

References

External links

Township website
County website

Townships in Clermont County, Ohio
Townships in Ohio